The 2009 LifeLock 400 was the fifteenth points race in the 2009 NASCAR Sprint Cup schedule. Held on Sunday, June 14 at Michigan International Speedway in Brooklyn, Michigan, it was the first of two races sponsored by the internet protection service LifeLock, the other being the LifeLock.com 400 at Chicagoland Speedway on July 11.

Background

Entry list

Qualifying

Results

References

LifeLock 400
LifeLock 400
NASCAR races at Michigan International Speedway
June 2009 sports events in the United States